Merkel Mill is a historic grist mill located on Maiden Creek in Greenwich Township, Berks County, Pennsylvania.  The mill was rebuilt in 1875, and is a -story, plus basement, banked building with a slate gable roof.  It measures 40 feet, 5 inches, by 50 feet, 9 inches, and has a 100-foot frame storage addition.  Also on the property are the contributing watercourses, including the dam, pond, and races.  It operated as a merchant mill and ceased operations in the 1950s.

It was listed on the National Register of Historic Places in 1990.

References

Grinding mills in Berks County, Pennsylvania
Grinding mills on the National Register of Historic Places in Pennsylvania
Industrial buildings completed in 1875
National Register of Historic Places in Berks County, Pennsylvania
1875 establishments in Pennsylvania